Zwi Perez Chajes, also Tzvi-Peretz Hayot, (13 October 1876 – 13 December 1927) was a rabbi, historian, biblical scholar and a notable Zionist leader.

Biography
Zwi Perez Chajes was born in 1876 in Brody, then part of Austria-Hungary, now in Ukraine. He was the grandson of the Zvi Hirsch Chajes. Hayot learned in a Yeshiva and was ordained as a rabbi and also studied at a university.

Chajes died in Vienna in 1927. His remains were later taken to Israel and he was reburied in the Trumpeldor cemetery in Tel Aviv.

Rabbinic career
Chajes served as the rabbi of the Jewish community in Florence, Italy from 1901 and also headed the rabbinical school in Florence. Until 1918, he served as a rabbi in the city of Trieste.

From 1918 to his death, Chajes served as the chief rabbi of the Jewish community of Vienna. In addition, he was Chairman of the Zionist General Council from 1921 to 1925

Commemoration
The main Jewish school in Vienna is named after him. When it reopened in 1984, it was first Jewish high school in the post-Holocaust German-speaking world.

References

1876 births
1927 deaths
Italian Zionists
20th-century Italian rabbis
20th-century Austrian rabbis
Austrian Orthodox rabbis
Chief rabbis of Vienna
Religious Zionist Orthodox rabbis
Jewish historians
Jewish biblical scholars
Jews from Galicia (Eastern Europe)
20th-century Jewish biblical scholars
Burials at Trumpeldor Cemetery
Clergy from Florence